Alison Margaret Bauld (born 7 May 1944) is an Australian writer and composer who lives and works in London, England.

Biography
Bauld was born in Sydney and studied piano with Alexander Sverjensky at the New South Wales Conservatorium of Music. She also studied acting at the National Institute of Dramatic Art and toured as a Shakespearian actress for a year before graduating with a Bachelor of Music degree from the University of Sydney. She continued her education in England through a university scholarship, studying composition with Elisabeth Lutyens and Hans Keller and graduated with a doctorate in composition from the University of York in 1974.

After completing her education, Bauld worked as a composer and music teacher. Her works have been performed internationally, and she has received a Gulbenkian Dance Award for composition.

Works
Selected works include:
Van Diemen's land, choral fantasy for mezzo-soprano, bass, 2 tenors, baritones, male speaker and a cappella chorus
Dear Emily, music theatre for actress/soprano and harp or piano. Text by William Blake and Alison Bauld
Nell, ballad opera
Farewell Already, adaptation from Richard III
Banquot's Buried, music theatre
Where Should Othello Go for tenor/baritone and piano
Pluto, theatrical chamber work for soprano, female chorus and instruments
No More of Love, song for soprano and piano
Play Your Way, three volume piano tutor
Van Diemen's Land for a cappella choir

Bauld has also published a novel:
Mozart's Sister (Autumn 2005) Alcina Press

References

1944 births
Living people
20th-century classical composers
Australian music educators
Australian women classical composers
Australian classical composers
Women music educators
20th-century women composers